Scotts Road is a road located in Central Area of Singapore. It was named after Captain William G. Scott, Harbour Master and Post Master of Singapore in 1836, who owned property and plantations on and around the area where Scotts Road now stands.

The name comes from the fact that it was home to the largest community of Scottish expatriates living in the colony before Singapore's independence.

References

Newton, Singapore
Orchard, Singapore
Roads in Singapore